"Gang Up" is a song recorded by American rappers Young Thug, 2 Chainz, Wiz Khalifa, and PnB Rock. The track was commissioned for the soundtrack of the 2017 action film The Fate of the Furious. "Gang Up", which is a hip hop and trap song, was released on March 24, 2017, as the soundtrack's fourth single in the United States.

Music video
The accompanying music video for "Gang Up" was uploaded to Young Thug's YouTube channel on April 14, 2017.

Charts

Certifications

References

External links

 

2017 singles
2017 songs
Young Thug songs
2 Chainz songs
Wiz Khalifa songs
PnB Rock songs
Songs written by Young Thug
Songs written by 2 Chainz
Songs written by Wiz Khalifa
Atlantic Records singles
Fast & Furious music
Songs written by Eskeerdo
Songs written by PnB Rock